Green River State Wildlife Area is an Illinois state park on  in Lee County, Illinois, United States.

This wildlife restoration area was acquired by the State of Illinois in 1940, using funds from the Federal Aid in Wildlife Restoration Act. It is frequented by hunters, hikers, birders and other outdoor enthusiasts. All but  of the area, that surrounding the area residence, are available for hunting.

References

State parks of Illinois
Protected areas of Lee County, Illinois
Protected areas established in 1940
1940 establishments in Illinois